The Last Generation of the Roman Republic (1974) is a scholarly work by Erich S. Gruen on the end of the Roman Republic in the 1st century BC.

The central argument of the work is that the Late Roman Republic can be characterised by the strength and continuity of its institutions, rather than by their gradual disintegration. The latter view was popularly accepted prior to the release of this work, that understanding initially begun by Ronald Syme's great work The Roman Revolution (1939). Gruen's work in The Last Generation is often considered a reply to Syme.

References

History books about ancient Rome
1974 non-fiction books